Denis Allen (2 January 1896 – 29 March 1961) was an Irish politician. In 1926 Allen was the Officer Commanding the North Wexford Battalion of the Irish Republican Army.  Allen later became a Fianna Fáil politician. 

Allen was an unsuccessful candidate at the June 1927 general election, but later that year at the September 1927 general election he was elected to Dáil Éireann as Fianna Fáil Teachta Dála (TD) for the Wexford constituency. He was re-elected at the 1932 general election, but lost his seat at the 1933 general election.

He returned to the 8th Dáil at a by-election on 17 August 1936, following the death of the Fine Gael TD Osmond Esmonde, and returned at each successive election until his death in office in 1961. No by-election was held for his seat.

References

1896 births
1961 deaths
Fianna Fáil TDs
Members of the 6th Dáil
Members of the 7th Dáil
Members of the 8th Dáil
Members of the 9th Dáil
Members of the 10th Dáil
Members of the 11th Dáil
Members of the 12th Dáil
Members of the 13th Dáil
Members of the 14th Dáil
Members of the 15th Dáil
Members of the 16th Dáil
20th-century Irish farmers